Kangaroo Creek Reservoir is a  artificial water storage reservoir in the Adelaide Hills, South Australia. It was built from 1966 to 1969, by damming the River Torrens west of Cudlee Creek. The stored water is used to maintain the Hope Valley Reservoir's level via discharge through the Torrens.

It is named after Kangaroo Creek, a tributary of the Torrens with a  drainage basin, which enters the reservoir on its southern side.

References

Geography of Adelaide
Dams completed in 1969
Embankment dams
Rock-filled dams
Dams in South Australia
Reservoirs in South Australia